The enzyme phosphopantothenoylcysteine decarboxylase catalyzes the chemical reaction

N-[(R)-4'-phosphopantothenoyl]-L-cysteine  pantotheine 4'-phosphate + CO2

This enzyme belongs to the family of lyases, to be specific the carboxy-lyases, which cleave carbon-carbon bonds.  The systematic name of this enzyme class is N-[(R)-4'-phosphopantothenoyl]-L-cysteine carboxy-lyase (pantotheine-4'-phosphate-forming).   This enzyme participates in coenzyme A (CoA) biosynthesis from pantothenic acid.

Structural studies

References 

 
 

EC 4.1.1
Enzymes of known structure